Piute Ponds are a group of ponds located about  southeast of Rosamond, California in the Mojave Desert, on the southwestern edge of Edwards Air Force Base and on the southern margin of Rosamond Lake, a dry lake bed. They form part of the Harley Berhow Recreational Area and are home to over 200 species of migratory birds.

Description
The largest remaining freshwater wetlands in Los Angeles County, 
the site is cited as an important bird area of California, and a resting ground for over 200 species of migratory birds such as the great blue heron, the great horned owl, the black-crowned night heron, and the western snowy plover. The area covers an area of about 9,600 acres and contains a number of claypan ponds such as Big Piute, Little Piute, Teal Pond, Ducks Unlimited Pond and Amargosa Creek and several other smaller ponds, creeks, and low sand dunes. A dike created the ponds, and they are maintained by treated reclaimed water pumped from Lancaster’s sewage treatment plant, with channels augmenting the ponds into two principal sets of large ponds.
Some 170 acres of wetlands were added to the complex of marshes in the late 1980s or early 1990s. Restricted hunting is permitted with a license in the fall, and the Piute Ponds Tour is conducted for tourists and bird enthusiasts.

Studies
The Piute Ponds have been studied extensively by ornithologists such as Kimball Garrett who collected data here over many years. Studies conducted in the late 1990s estimated that the marshes of Piute were home to over 150,000 frogs. In 1990, vertebrate fossils were unearthed from lacustrine silts and sands at the site. The Mojave Environmental Education Consortium (MEEC) provides education kits for children for field studies in the ponds, with a night sounds CD, casting kits, owl pellet kits, a field press and dryers, magnifying glasses, vials, and microscopes and other equipment.

References

External links
Official site
Site map
Satellite images

Rosamond, California
Lakes of Los Angeles County, California
Edwards Air Force Base
Lakes of the Mojave Desert
Wetlands and marshes of Los Angeles County, California
Lakes of California
Landforms of Los Angeles County, California
Lakes of Southern California